Events from the year 1917 in Romania.

Incumbents
King: Ferdinand I of Romania
Prime Minister: Ion I. C. Brătianu

Events
January 13: Ciurea rail disaster. The worst rail accident in Romanian history and third worst in the history of the world, with most estimates falling between 800 and 1000 deaths.
July 22-August 1: Battle of Mărăști
August 6-September 8: Battle of Mărășești. The largest battle to take part on the Romanian front during World War I.
August 8–22: Third Battle of Oituz
September 13: Romania establishes diplomatic relations with Japan. King Ferdinand names Nicolae Xenopol as plenipotentiary minister to Tokyo.
December 9: Armistice of Focșani is signed, ending the hostilities between Romania and the Central Powers.

Births

 March 18: Mircea Ionescu-Quintus – politician, senator, centenarian, Minister of Justice and chairman of the National Liberal Party (PNL) from 1993 to 2001.
 March 19: Dinu Lipatti – classical pianist and composer, posthumously elected into the Romanian Academy.
 June 6: Ion Rațiu – politician and the presidential candidate of the Christian Democratic National Peasants' Party (PNȚ) in the 1990 elections.
 June 20: Iosif Constantin Drăgan – Romanian and Italian businessman, writer, historian and founder of the ButanGas company, who was at one time the richest man in Romania.
 August 28:  – playwright.
 August 22: Alexandru Piru – literary critic, historian and member of the Parliament between 1990 and 1992.
 August 25: Ion Diaconescu – anti-Communist activist and politician who spent seventeen years as a political prisoner and later became a leader of the Christian-Democratic National Peasants' Party (PNŢCD).
 September 3: Eugen Frunză – poet who co-wrote the lyrics to Te slăvim, Românie, which was the national anthem between 1953 and 1975.
 November 18: Dinu Negreanu  - director who created a string of films in the 1950s.
 December 13: Miron Constantinescu – communist politician, a leading member of the Romanian Communist Party, as well as a Marxist sociologist, historian, academic, and journalist.

Deaths
February 9: Aurel Popovici – lawyer and politician who proposed the federalization of Austria-Hungary under the United States of Greater Austria.
May 14: Emil Rebreanu - Austro-Hungarian Romanian military officer executed during World War I for trying to desert to the Romanian side. The 1922 novel Forest of the Hanged by his brother, Liviu Rebreanu, is influenced by his experience.
June 18: Titu Maiorescu - literary critic and politician, founder of the Junimea Society. As a literary critic, he was instrumental in the development of Romanian culture in the second half of the 19th century.
August 27: Ion Grămadă – writer, historian and journalist who died in battle.
August 28: Calistrat Hogaș – prose writer whose collected short stories were published posthumously.
September 3: Ecaterina Teodoroiu - woman who fought and died in World War I, and is regarded as war hero of Romania, where she is known as the ”heroine of the Jiu”.
December 18: Nicolae Xenopol – Politician, diplomat, economist, writer and first Romanian ambassador to Japan. Died in Tokyo, only months after taking the position.

References

Years of the 20th century in Romania
1910s in Romania
 
Romania
Romania